Danseys Pass (often incorrectly referred to as Dansey's Pass or Dansey Pass) (el. 935 m.) is a mountain pass located in the Kakanui Range in the South Island of New Zealand.

The pass itself is located at the boundary of the Waitaki and the Central Otago districts. In this location, it is also the boundary between the Canterbury and Otago regions. The road lies between the Maniototo plain (part of the Taieri River water catchment) and the northern foothills of the Kakanui Mountains (part of the Waitaki River catchment). Much of the road going over Danseys Pass is unsealed and is occasionally cut directly from the Haast Schist bedrock. The road was built for the owners of large sheep runs, the brothers Allan McLean and John McLean.

Though not a major arterial road, the pass is a fairly well-used link between the towns of Naseby and Ranfurly in the south and Duntroon, in North Otago.

The locality of Danseys Pass is located approximately halfway between the pass and Duntroon on the eastern side within the Waitaki District. The historic Danseys Pass Coach Inn/Danseys Pass Hotel is located on the western side within the Central Otago District, at the locality known as Kyeburn Diggings or Upper Kyeburn, north of Kyeburn.

The pass and road are named after William Heywood Dansey. He was the lessee of the Otekaike run from 1857 to 1871 who, in 1855 with three companions, was the first European to cross the pass in search for land in the Maniototo district.

References

External links

Maniototo Promotions information on Danseys Pass
Danseys Pass Coach Inn

Landforms of Otago
Landforms of Canterbury, New Zealand
Mountain passes of New Zealand